Sucks Blood is the sixth studio album by the American garage rock band Oh Sees, released on May 15, 2007 on Castle Face Records. The album is the band's second to be released under the name The Oh Sees, and is their final album before changing their name to Thee Oh Sees.

Release 
To release the album, vocalist and guitarist John Dwyer founded Castle Face Records, alongside Matt Jones and Brian Lee Hughes.

Track listing

References

2007 albums
Oh Sees albums
Castle Face Records albums